Debbie Senesky is an associate professor of Aeronautics at Stanford University. She is the principal investigator of the EXtreme Environment Microsystems Laboratory, and studies nanomaterials in extreme environments.

Early life and education 
Senesky was interested in maths as a child. She studied mechanical engineering at the University of Southern California and was the first member of her family to go to college. During her undergraduate degree she worked in a cleanroom. She moved to the University of California, Berkeley for her doctoral studies, earning a Master's in 2004 and a PhD in 2007. Her PhD looked at heat resistant materials and was supported by an Alfred P. Sloan Foundation fellowship. After her doctorate, Senesky worked at GE Sensing and Hewlett-Packard.

Career 
Senesky is an aerospace engineer who works on nanoscale sensors that can work in extreme conditions. She was appointed to the aeronautics department at Stanford University in 2012. She was awarded an Early Career Faculty Space Tech Research Grant from NASA in 2012. Since 2014 she has led the EXtreme Environment Microsystems Laboratory (X-Lab) at Stanford University. In 2015 she designed a soot-particulate sensor with Stephen Luby. The sensor was made from Gallium nitride, sapphire and metal–semiconductor interfaces. She was selected as a speaker for the Stanford University Rising Stars conference in 2017. She edited the 2014 SPIE volume Sensors for Extreme Harsh Environments.

Women in science activities 
Senesky is involved with a number of initiatives to improve diversity in science. She serves on the board of the nonprofit Scientific Adventures for Girls.  She delivered a keynote at the Introduce a Girl to Engineering celebration at Agilent Technologies. In 2018 she chaired the Women in Aerospace Symposium at Stanford University. She appeared on the podcast People Behind the Science. She is a member of the NASA space technology mission directorate.

Awards and honours 

 2018 AnitaB.org Emerging Leader Abie Award in Honor of Denice Denton
 2016 National Academy of Engineering Selected Participant, US Frontiers of Engineering Symposium
 2015 IEEE Electron Devices Society Golden Reviewer
 2012 NASA Early Faculty Career Award
 2012 Stanford University Frederick E. Terman Faculty Fellow
 2012 Stanford University Gabilan Faculty Fellow
 2004 Sloan Foundation Ph.D. Fellowship

References 

American women engineers
American mechanical engineers
Stanford University faculty
University of Southern California alumni
UC Berkeley College of Engineering alumni
Year of birth missing (living people)
Living people
21st-century American women